José Azueta Municipality is a municipality in Veracruz, Mexico.

Geography
It is located in south zone of the State of Veracruz, about 205 km from state capital Xalapa. It has a surface of 582.63 km2.

Borders
José Azueta Municipality is delimited to the north by Tlacotalpan Municipality and Amatitlán Municipality to the east by Isla Municipality, to the south by Playa Vicente Municipality, to the west by Chacaltianguis Municipality, Cosamaloapan Municipality and Oaxaca State.

Products
It produces principally maize,  beans, rice, watermelon, green chile and sugarcane.

Events
In  José Azueta , in November takes place the celebration in honor to Cristo Rey, Patron of the town.

Weather
The weather in  José Azueta  is warm all year with rains in summer and autumn.

References

External links 

  Municipal Official webpage
  Municipal Official Information

Municipalities of Veracruz